The Midland Trail is a National Scenic Byway which carries U.S. Route 60 (US 60) through a portion of the southern part of the U.S. state of West Virginia between Charleston and Sam Black Church. It was part of the longer transcontinental Midland Trail.

In this area, the Midland Trail follows the route of the historic James River and Kanawha Turnpike, an early road linking canals in the James River in Virginia with the navigable portion of the Kanawha River in West Virginia.

The Midland Trail crosses some of the most rugged terrain of the Mountain State. The trail is believed to have been originally carved into the mountains by buffalo and native peoples. In 1790, George Washington ordered the trail cleared. The trail came to be traveled by stage coaches and soldiers in the Civil War.

Prior to 1988, the Midland Trail was heavily traveled, particularly by commercial vehicles, including large trucks transporting coal and timber. Traffic was significantly reduced in 1988 when the final section of Interstate 64 (I-64) was completed. The last section of I-64 (which does not closely parallel US 60 in this area) cost about $300 million to build, making it one of the most costly sections in the entire U.S. Interstate Highway System.

Although considerably shorter than the Interstate Highway routing via the West Virginia Turnpike, these days, the Midland Trail serves mostly local traffic and shunpikers seeking a bucolic interlude. It passes through both the Kanawha River Valley and the plateau high above. Notable communities and  sites along this portion of the Midland Trail of nearby include:

 Babcock State Park
 Camp Washington Carver
 Glen Ferris at the falls of the Kanawha River
 Gauley Bridge and nearby Cathedral Falls
 Hawk's Nest with a spectacular overlook of the New River far below, Hawk's Nest State Park, and an aerial tram to the canyon.
 Ansted site of the Halfway House, Tyree's Tavern, the home of coal mine operator William Nelson Page and the grave of Julia Neale Jackson, mother of Confederate General Stonewall Jackson
 New River Gorge Bridge world's 2nd longest single arch steel span. At , it is the second highest bridge in the United States
 New River Gorge National Park and Preserve with free overlooks and Visitors Center, several whitewater rafting services nearby
 Rainelle
 Sam Black Church

Due to the mountain switchbacks and long, steep grades, drivers of recreational vehicles and inexperienced drivers are advised to use extra caution, particularly during inclement weather conditions.

See also

References

External links 
 Midland Trail National Scenic Highway WV Rt.60
 Hawk's Nest State Park
 New River CVB Guide to Ansted, WV
 Biographical item on William Jordan, an African-American photographer that includes the Gauley Mountain Coal Company startup timeframe
 West Virginia Coal Mines site
 Chicago Dragoons
 New River Gorge website
 National Park Service - New river Gorge National River
 Roads To the Future - New River Gorge Bridge webpage

Midland Trail
Midland Trail
Transportation in West Virginia
Tourist attractions in Fayette County, West Virginia
Transportation in Fayette County, West Virginia
U.S. Route 60